Nanomaterials is an interdisciplinary scientific journal that covers all aspects of nanomaterials. The journal publishes theoretical and experimental research articles and studies about synthesis and use of nanomaterials. 

It was founded in 2010. The journal is published by MDPI, as of 2022 editor in chief is Shirley Chiang, an American microscopist from University of California, Davis, the Department of Physics and Astronomy.

Abstracting and indexing 
The journal is abstracted and indexed in:

 CAPlus / SciFinder
 CNKI
 DOAJ
 EBSCO
 Elsevier Databases (Scopus)
 OpenAIRE
 OSTI (U.S. Department of Energy)
 PATENTSCOPE
 Web of Science

According to the Journal Citation Reports, the journal has a 2021 impact factor of 5.719.

References

External links 

 
English-language journals

MDPI academic journals